The 2010–11 Primera Divisió was the sixteenth season of top-tier football in Andorra. It began on 19 September 2010 and ended on 20 March 2011. FC Santa Coloma were the defending champions, having won their fifth Andorran championship last season.

Stadia and locations

Competition format
The participating teams first played a conventional round-robin schedule with every team playing each opponent once "home" and once "away" (in actuality, the designation of home and away was purely arbitrary as the clubs did not have their own grounds) for a total of 14 games. The league was then split up in two groups of four teams with each of them playing teams within their group in a home-and-away cycle of games. The top four teams competed for the championship. The bottom four clubs played for one direct relegation spot and one relegation play-off spot. Records earned in the First Round were taken over to the respective Second Rounds.

Promotion and relegation from 2009–10
Engordany were relegated after last season due to finishing in 8th place. They were replaced by Segona Divisió champions Casa Estrella del Benfica.

Encamp, who finished last season in 7th place, and 3rd place Segona Divisió club Extremenya played a two-legged relegation play-off (normally, the runners-up of the Segona Divisió would participate, but as promotion-ineligible Lusitanos B finished in that spot, the playoff spot was given to the 3rd place club). Encamp kept their spot in Primera Divisió by winning on aggregate 5–2 against Extremenya.

First round

League table

Results

Second round

Championship Round

Relegation Round

Relegation playoffs
FC Encamp finished seventh in the league and will compete in a two-legged relegation playoff against UE Engordany, the third place team of the Segona Divisió, for one spot in 2011–12 Primera Divisió. Engordany won the playoff, 5–1 on aggregate, and were promoted to the Primera Divisió while Encamp were relegated.

External links
 Official site 

Primera Divisió seasons
Andorra
1